Events from the year 1609 in art.

Events
 January 9 – Letters patent issued relating to accommodation and workshops for artists in the Louvre Palace mezzanine in Paris.
 Hans Krumpper becomes chief sculptor to the Bavarian court under Maximilian I, Elector of Bavaria.
 Mesrop of Khizan paints a Gospel which ends up in the Bodleian Library, Oxford.

Paintings

Caravaggio
The Raising of Lazarus
Adoration of the Shepherds
Nativity with St. Francis and St. Lawrence
Salome with the Head of John the Baptist (Royal Palace of Madrid)
Adam Elsheimer – The Flight into Egypt
El Greco – Christ Driving the Money Changers from the Temple (San Ginés, Madrid)
Peter Paul Rubens – some dates approximate
Adoration of the Magi (original version for Antwerp City Hall)
The Head of Saint John the Baptist Presented to Salome (c.)
Honeysuckle Bower
Judith Beheading Holofernes
Portrait of a young woman with a rosary

Births
January 20 – Carlo Ceresa, Italian painter of portraitures, altarpieces and religious works (died 1679)
March 1 (baptised) – Ambrosius Bosschaert the Younger, Dutch painter (died 1645)
March 16 – Agostino Mitelli, Italian painter of quadratura (died 1660)
March 23 (baptised) – Giovanni Benedetto Castiglione, Italian painter (died 1664)
May 6 (baptised) – Antonie Waterloo, Dutch painter, publisher and draughtsman
July 28 – Judith Leyster, Dutch painter of Haarlem (died 1660)
August 25 – Giovanni Battista Salvi or Sassoferrato, Italian painter (died 1685)
August 30 – Artus Quellinus the Elder, Flemish sculptor (died 1668)
December 11 – Alexander Cooper, English Baroque miniature painter (died 1660)
date unknown
Jacob Adriaensz Backer, Dutch painter (died 1651)
Giovanni Angelo Canini, Italian painter and engraver (died 1666)
Giovanni Domenico Cerrini, Italian painter from the Bolognese School (died 1681)
Samuel Cooper, English miniature painter (died 1672)
Bernardino Gagliardi, Italian painter of the Baroque period (died 1660)
Salomon Koninck, Dutch painter of genre scenes and portraits and engraver (died 1656)
Carlo Francesco Nuvolone, Italian painter working in Lombardy (died 1661 or 1662)
Tobias Pock, Austrian painter (died 1683)
Herman Saftleven, Dutch painter of the Baroque period (died 1685)
Giulio Cesare Venenti, Italian painter of landscapes and engraver (died 1697)
probable
François Collignon, French engraver, print-seller and publisher (died 1687)
Domenico Gargiulo, Italian painter of landscapes (died 1675)

Deaths
July 15 – Annibale Carracci, Italian painter (born 1560)
July 20 – Federico Zuccari, Italian Mannerist painter and architect (born 1542/1543)
October – Joseph Heintz the Elder, Swiss painter, draftsman and architect (born 1564)
date unknown
Giovanni Battista Armenini, Italian art historian and critic (born 1530)
Aegidius Sadeler I, Flemish engraver of the Sadeler family (born 1555)
Giusto Utens, Flemish painter of a series of Medicean villas (born unknown)
Tiburzio Vergelli, Italian sculptor and founder (born 1551)

References

 
Years of the 17th century in art
1600s in art